The second season from the anime series Naruto is directed by Hayato Date, and produced by Studio Pierrot and TV Tokyo. Based on Masashi Kishimoto's manga series, the season follows Naruto Uzumaki succeeding the Chūnin Exams only to discover the invasion of the Leaf Village.

The second season aired from November 12, 2003 to September 29, 2004 on TV Tokyo.

The English dub aired on both Cartoon Network's Toonami and YTV's Bionix programming blocks from November 11, 2006 to August 19, 2007.

Sony Pictures Entertainment collected the episodes in a total of twelve DVD volumes under the name "2nd Stage", between January and December 1, 2004. Episodes from this season were released on by Viz Media between the ninth and twenty-first DVD volumes from the series, while several uncut DVD boxes have also been released.

Six pieces of theme music are used for the episodes in Japanese version; two opening themes and four closing themes. The opening theme for the English airing is "Haruka Kanata" by Asian Kung-Fu Generation, which is used until episode 80, and is then replaced by "GO!!!" in the same way as the Japanese version, while the closing theme is "Rise" by Jeremy Sweet and Ian Nickus, which is used in all episodes.



Episode list

References

2003 Japanese television seasons
2004 Japanese television seasons
Naruto episodes